Chafford Hundred Lakeside railway station, also known simply as Chafford Hundred station, is located on a single-track branch line of the London, Tilbury and Southend line, serving the area of Chafford Hundred as well as Lakeside Shopping Centre in Essex. Its three-letter station code is CFH.

The station has a single platform and was opened on 26 May 1995 by Railtrack. Today, all passenger train services are operated by c2c, which also manages the station. Although outside the London fare zones 1 to 6, the station became part of the Oyster card pay-as-you-go network in 2010. According to the ORR, the station is the busiest single-platform station in the UK, beating the next busiest (Windsor and Eton Central) by some 900,000 passengers per year.

History

Following the opening of Lakeside Shopping Centre in 1990 a new single-platform station was opened on 26 May 1995 by Railtrack. The £1 million station was funded by the Chafford Hundred development consortium. Initially a free shuttle bus connected the station to the shopping centre, with a direct pedestrian bridge link replacing the bus in 2000.

Usage is moderate for a suburban station and increasing; to expand capacity the buildings were rebuilt in 2006. The "Lakeside" suffix has occasionally been added to the name to not only reflect its location in the town of Chafford Hundred but also its proximity to the shopping centre. However, many continue to simply call the station Chafford Hundred for sake of brevity.

Services
The typical off-peak service frequency is:

Connections

Local buses 33 and X80 serve the station.

Notes

References

External links

Transport in Thurrock
Railway stations in Essex
DfT Category E stations
Railway stations opened by Railtrack
Railway stations in Great Britain opened in 1995
Railway stations served by c2c